Enterodictyon is a genus of lichen-forming fungi in the family Roccellaceae.

References

Roccellaceae
Lichen genera
Arthoniomycetes genera
Taxa named by Johannes Müller Argoviensis
Taxa described in 1892